is a Japanese composer. She was born in Tokyo, and studied composition at Tokyo University of the Arts.

Honors and awards
First prize, Music Competition of Japan
Outstanding Composition Award, Japan Symphony Foundation
Mitsubishi Trust Art and Cultural Foundation award (2003)

Works
Kinoshita is known in Japan for choral music, but writes for orchestra and chamber ensemble, and instruments, as well. Selected works include:
Koten for orchestra
Fantasy, for orchestra
Aura, for Orchestra
Alice's Adventures in Wonderland (Opera)
Abyss of Night (for orchestra)
Sinfonietta (for Strings)
Gothic (for wind band)
Rain (for mandolin orchestra)
Percussion Concerto  (for Percussion solo & percussion ensemble)
The Trembling Moon (for Percussion ensemble)
Twisting Landscapes (for Clarinet, Violin and Piano)
A Circuit of Dreams (for Piano)
Jashumon-Hikyoku (for mixed voices and orchestra)
Blue (for female voices and percussion)
Nirvana (vocal & piano)
Circuit of Dream (piano suite)

Her music has been recorded and issued on CD, including:
The Trembling Moon, (chamber music / ALM Records)
Jashumon-Hikyoku (chorus and orchestra / Fontec)
Blessing (chorus without accompaniment / Japan Traditional Cultures Foundation)
Tsuyoshi Mihara Sings Makiko Kinoshita (lied album / Fontec)

References

External links
 

1956 births
20th-century classical composers
20th-century Japanese musicians
21st-century classical composers
21st-century Japanese musicians
Japanese classical composers
Japanese women classical composers
Japanese music educators
Living people
20th-century Japanese educators
21st-century Japanese educators
Women music educators
Japanese women educators
20th-century women composers
21st-century women composers
20th-century women educators
21st-century women educators
21st-century Japanese women musicians